Davlat Bobonov (born 7 June 1997) is an Uzbek judoka. He won one of the bronze medals in the men's 90 kg event at the 2020 Summer Olympics in Tokyo, Japan.
 
He is the 2020 Judo Grand Slam Düsseldorf gold medallist in the −90 kg class.

He won one of the bronze medals in his event at the 2022 Judo Grand Slam Paris held in Paris, France.

References

External links

 
 
 

1997 births
Living people
Uzbeks
Uzbekistani male judoka
Islamic Solidarity Games medalists in judo
Islamic Solidarity Games competitors for Uzbekistan
Olympic bronze medalists for Uzbekistan
Olympic medalists in judo
Medalists at the 2020 Summer Olympics
Judoka at the 2020 Summer Olympics
Olympic judoka of Uzbekistan